This list of gastropods described in 2011, is a list of new taxa of snails and slugs of every kind that have been described (following the rules of the ICZN) during the year 2011. The list only includes taxa at the level of genus or species. For changes in taxonomy above the level of genus, see Changes in the taxonomy of gastropods since 2005.

Fossil gastropods 
from Basteria:
Limacina asiatica (Janssen in Janssen et al., 2011)
Limacina dzheroiensis (Janssen in Janssen et al., 2011)

from Molluscan Research:
Latia manuherikia Marshall, 2011

Marine gastropods 

from Basteria:
Coralliophila luglii Smriglio & Mariottini, 2011

from Journal of Molluscan Studies:
Corambe mancorensis Martynov et al., 2011
 new family Horaiclavidae Bouchet, Kantor, Sysoev & Puillandre, 2011

from Molluscan Research:
Santondella dantarti Luque, Geiger & Rolan, 2011 
Santondella cachoi Luque, Geiger & Rolan, 2011
Merelina hirta Criscione & Ponder, 2011
Merelina cancellata Criscione & Ponder, 2011
Merelina lordhowensis Criscione & Ponder, 2011
Merelina norfolkensis Criscione & Ponder, 2011

from PLoS ONE:
 Pseudunela marteli Neusser, Jörger & Schrödl, 2011
 Pseudunela viatoris Neusser, Jörger & Schrödl, 2011

from Proceedings of the Academy of Natural Sciences of Philadelphia:
 Lienardia sp.

from Ruthenica:
 Lienardia acrolineata Fedosov, 2011
 Lienardia grandiradula Fedosov, 2011
 Lienardia multicolor Fedosov, 2011
 Lienardia roseangulata Fedosov, 2011
 Lienardia tagaroae Fedosov, 2011

from Tropical Zoology:
 Heliacus willianseverii Tenório, Barros, Francisco & Silva, 2011
 Pseudotorinia jonasi Tenório, Barros, Francisco & Silva, 2011
 Psilaxis clertoni Tenório, Barros, Francisco & Silva, 2011
 Solatisonax cabrali Tenório, Barros, Francisco & Silva, 2011
 Solatisonax rudigerbieleri Tenório, Barros, Francisco & Silva, 2011

from Zootaxa:
Eulimella torquata Pimenta, Dos Santos & Absalão, 2011
Eulimella cylindrata Pimenta, Dos Santos & Absalão, 2011
Eulimella ejuncida Pimenta, Dos Santos & Absalão, 2011* 

from Invertebrate Systematics:
Dendronotus patricki Stout, Wilson & Valdés, 2011

Freshwater gastropods 

from Journal of Molluscan Studies:
 Pseudotryonia mica Hershler, Liu & Landye, 2011
 Pseudotryonia pasajae Hershler, Liu & Landye, 2011
 Chorrobius Hershler, Liu & Landye, 2011
 Chorrobius crassilabrum Hershler, Liu & Landye, 2011
 Minckleyella Hershler, Liu & Landye, 2011
 Minckleyella balnearis Hershler, Liu & Landye, 2011

from Molluscan Research:
Trochotaia pyramidella Du, Yang & Chen, 2011

from Parasites & Vectors
 Lymnaea meridensis Bargues, Artigas & Mas-Coma, 2011

from Zoologica Scripta:
Sulawesidrobia perempuan Zielske, Glaubrecht & Haase, 2011
Sulawesidrobia soedjatmokoi Zielske, Glaubrecht & Haase, 2011
Sulawesidrobia mahalonaensis Zielske, Glaubrecht & Haase, 2011
Sulawesidrobia anceps Zielske, Glaubrecht & Haase, 2011
Sulawesidrobia bicolor Zielske, Glaubrecht & Haase, 2011
Sulawesidrobia megalodon Zielske, Glaubrecht & Haase, 2011
Sulawesidrobia abreui Zielske, Glaubrecht & Haase, 2011
Sulawesidrobia datar Zielske, Glaubrecht & Haase, 2011
Sulawesidrobia yunusi Zielske, Glaubrecht & Haase, 2011
Sulawesidrobia towutiensis Zielske, Glaubrecht & Haase, 2011

from Zootaxa:
Tryonia allendae Hershler, Liu & Landye, 2011
Tryonia angosturae Hershler, Liu & Landye, 2011
Tryonia chuviscarae Hershler, Liu & Landye, 2011
Tryonia contrerasi Hershler, Liu & Landye, 2011
Tryonia julimesensis Hershler, Liu & Landye, 2011
Tryonia metcalfi Hershler, Liu & Landye, 2011
Tryonia minckleyi Hershler, Liu & Landye, 2011
Tryonia molinae Hershler, Liu & Landye, 2011
Tryonia oasiensis Hershler, Liu & Landye, 2011
Tryonia ovata Hershler, Liu & Landye, 2011
Tryonia peregrina Hershler, Liu & Landye, 2011
Tryonia taylori Hershler, Liu & Landye, 2011
Tryonia zaragozae Hershler, Liu & Landye, 2011

Land gastropods 

from Archiv für Molluskenkunde:
 Napaeus delicatus Alonso, Yanes & Ibáñez, 2011
 Napaeus minimus Holyoak & Holyoak, 2011

from Basteria:
Charpentieria clavata triumplinae Nardi, 2011
Tanzartemon seddonae Tattersfield & Rowson, 2011
Tanzartemon Tattersfield & Rowson, 2011
Tanzartemon mkungwensis Tattersfield & Rowson, 2011
Helicina duo Breure, 2011

from Journal of Conchology:
Balcanodiscus (Balcanodiscus) danyii Erőss, Fehér & Páll-Gergely, 2011
 Napaeus alucensis Santana & Yanes, 2011
 Napaeus gomerensis G. A. Holyoak & D. T. Holyoak, 2011
 Napaeus moroi Martín, Alonso & Ibáñez, 2011
 Napaeus torilensis Artiles & Deniz, 2011

from Malacologia:
 genus Australocosmica Köhler, 2011
 Australocosmica augustae Köhler, 2011
 Australocosmica sanctumpatriciusae Köhler, 2011
 Australocosmica vulcanica Köhler, 2011
 Amplirhagada globosa Köhler, 2011
 Amplirhagada sinenomine Köhler, 2011
 Amplirhagada storriana Köhler, 2011
 Amplirhagada alkuonides Köhler, 2011
 Kimboraga glabra Köhler, 2011
 Kimboraga wulalam Köhler, 2011
 Kimboraga cascadensis Köhler, 2011
 Globorhagada confusa Köhler, 2011
 Globorhagada wurroolgu Köhler, 2011
 Globorhagada yoowadan Köhler, 2011
 Globorhagada uwinsensis Köhler, 2011
 Rhagada biggeana Köhler, 2011
 Rhagada kessneri Köhler, 2011
 Rhagada sheaei Köhler, 2011
 Rhagada felicitas Köhler, 2011
 Rhagada dominica Köhler, 2011
 Rhagada primigena Köhler, 2011
 Retroterra aequabilis Köhler, 2011
 Retroterra discoidea Köhler, 2011
 Retroterra acutocostata Köhler, 2011
 genus Molema Köhler, 2011
 Molema stankowskii Köhler, 2011
 Baudinella thielei Köhler, 2011
 Baudinella boongareensis Köhler, 2011
 Baudinella tuberculata Köhler, 2011
 Baudinella setobaudinioides Köhler, 2011
 Baudinella occidentalis Köhler, 2011
 Setobaudinia kalumburuana Köhler, 2011
 Setobaudinia herculea Köhler, 2011
 Setobaudinia ngurraali Köhler, 2011
 Setobaudinia umbadayi Köhler, 2011
 Setobaudinia wuyurru Köhler, 2011
 Setobaudinia capillacea Köhler, 2011
 Setobaudinia garlinju Köhler, 2011
 Setobaudinia gumalamala Köhler, 2011
 Setobaudinia insolita Köhler, 2011
 Setobaudinia quinta Köhler, 2011
 Setobaudinia joycei Köhler, 2011
 Setobaudinia karczewski Köhler, 2011
 Torresitrachia aquilonia Köhler, 2011
 Torresitrachia eclipsis Köhler, 2011
 Torresitrachia janszi Köhler, 2011
 Torresitrachia urvillei Köhler, 2011
 Torresitrachia brookei Köhler, 2011
 Torresitrachia baudini Köhler, 2011
 Torresitrachia allouarni Köhler, 2011
 Torresitrachia flindersi Köhler, 2011
 Torresitrachia freycineti Köhler, 2011
 Torresitrachia tasmani Köhler, 2011
 Torresitrachia houtmani houtmani Köhler, 2011
 Torresitrachia houtmani dampieri Köhler, 2011
 Torresitrachia leichhardti Köhler, 2011
 Torresitrachia hartogi Köhler, 2011
 Torresitrachia girgarinae Köhler, 2011
 genus Kimberleytrachia Köhler, 2011
 Kimberleytrachia somniator Köhler, 2011
 Kimberleytrachia alphacentauri Köhler, 2011
 Kimberleytrachia aequum Köhler, 2011
 Kimberleytrachia canopi Köhler, 2011
 Kimberleytrachia chartacea Köhler, 2011
 Kimberleytrachia hirsuta Köhler, 2011
 Kimberleytrachia achernaria Köhler, 2011
 Kimberleytrachia amplirhagadoides Köhler, 2011

from Records of the Australian Museum:
 Amplirhagada atlantis Köhler, 2011
 Amplirhagada carsoniana Köhler, 2011
 Amplirhagada alicunda Köhler, 2011
 Amplirhagada moraniana Köhler, 2011
 Amplirhagada davidsoniana Köhler, 2011
 Amplirhagada vialae Köhler, 2011
 Amplirhagada discoidea Köhler, 2011
 Amplirhagada forrestiana Köhler, 2011
 Amplirhagada inusitata Köhler, 2011
 Amplirhagada coffea Köhler, 2011
 Amplirhagada gardneriana Köhler, 2011
 Amplirhagada lindsayae Köhler, 2011
 Amplirhagada bendraytoni Köhler, 2011
 Amplirhagada angustocauda Köhler, 2011
 Ampirhagada epiphallica Köhler, 2011

from The Veliger
 Hendersoniella miquihuanae Thompson & Correa-Sandoval, 2011

from Zootaxa:
 Napaeus aringaensis Yanes et al., 2011
 Napaeus grohi Yanes et al., 2011
 Napaeus josei Yanes et al., 2011
 Napaeus validoi Yanes et al., 2011
 Napaeus venegueraensis Yanes et al., 2011
 Plectotropis yonganensis Zhou, Xiao, Chen & Wang, 2011

See also 
 List of gastropods described in the 2000s
 List of gastropods described in 2010
 List of gastropods described in 2012

References

External links 
 Articles about molluscs in Zootaxa

Gastropods